Quorn is a meat substitute.

Quorn may also refer to:
Quorn, Leicestershire (or Quorndon), a village in England after which the meat substitute product is named
 Quorn Hunt, a fox hunt in Leicestershire once based at Quorndon
 HMS Quorn, one of three ships named after the hunt
 Quorn F.C., a football club based in the village
Quorn, South Australia, a town and locality in the Flinders Ranges
Quorn railway station, a railway station in South Australia

See also 
 Quern, a place in Germany
 Quern-stone, a tool for grinding